is a railway station on the Hanshin Electric Railway Main Line in Fukushima-ku, Osaka, Japan.  The headquarters of Hanshin Electric Railway Co., Ltd. is located in the north of the Station.

Connecting lines from Noda on the Hanshin Railway Main Line
Osaka Metro Sennichimae Line
West Japan Railway Company (JR West) JR Tōzai Line

Layout
There are 2 elevated island platforms with 2 tracks each.

Surroundings
the headquarters of Hanshin Electric Railway Co., Ltd.
WISTE
Osaka Municipal Fukushima Library

Adjacent stations

Fukushima-ku, Osaka
Hanshin Main Line
Railway stations in Osaka
Railway stations in Japan opened in 1905